The 1939 Oregon State Beavers football team represented Oregon State College in the 1939 college football season. The Beavers ended this season with nine wins, one loss, and one tie.  The Beavers scored 186 points and allowed 77 points. Oregon State won the inaugural Pineapple Bowl, 39–6.  The team was led by head coach Lon Stiner.

Schedule
The Beavers finished the season with a 9–1–1 record, 6–1–1 in the Pacific Coast Conference.  Ranks are based on the time the game was played.

Team players drafted into the NFL

References

Further reading
 Bud Forester (ed.), 1939 Oregon State Football Information, Corvallis, OR: Oregon State College Athletic News Bureau, 1939.

Oregon State
Oregon State Beavers football seasons
Pineapple Bowl champion seasons
Oregon State Beavers football